Sir Edward Denison Ross (6 June 1871 – 20 September 1940) was an orientalist and linguist, specializing in languages of the Middle East, Central and East Asia. He was the first director of the University of London's School of Oriental Studies (now SOAS, University of London) from 1916 to 1937.

Ross read in 49 languages, and spoke in 30. He was director of the British Information Bureau for the Near East. Sometime after 1877, Ross wrote an Introduction a reprint of George Sale's translation of the Quran. Along with Eileen Power, he wrote and edited a 26-volume series published by George Routledge & Sons, The Broadway Travellers. The series included the diary of the 17th-century naval chaplain Henry Teonge. Ross joined the staff of the British Museum in 1914, appointed to catalogue the collections of Sir Aurel Stein. He was an original trustee of the E. J. W. Gibb Memorial Series. In 1934 Edward Denison Ross attended Ferdowsi Millenary Celebration in Tehran. 

In January 1940, shortly after the outbreak of WWII in Europe, Ross was named head of the British Information Bureau at Istanbul with the rank of Counsellor. As an acquaintance of the deceased Turkish leader Mustafa Kemal Ataturk, Ross was eager to serve his country from Turkey. However, the loss of his wife Dora in April 1940 was more than he could bare, and Sir Ross himself died in Istanbul at age 69 in September 1940. He is buried at the Haydarpasha English Cemetery in Uskudar.

References

Further reading
Sir Edward Dennison Ross (1871 - 1940): A Persian Scholar and Orientalist Par Excellence by R M Chopra, INDO-IRANICA, Vol.LXVI, Nos.1 to 4, 2013

External links
 
 

1871 births
1940 deaths
Linguists from England
British orientalists
Employees of the British Museum